Rahal may refer to:

People with surname Rahal
Bashar Rahal (born 1974), actor
Bobby Rahal (born 1953), race car driver mainly known for American open-wheel racing including the Indianapolis 500
Graham Rahal (born 1989), race car driver mainly known for American open-wheel racing and son of Bobby Rahal
Nick Rahall (born 1949), U.S. politician from West Virginia, Democratic party member of House of Representatives
Nigar Rahal or Ashore İbo Rahal (born 1981), Brazilian television celebrity
Rahal Abdul or Page Rahal (born 1966), former Member of the Islamic State of Iraq and the Levant

Places
Rahal Rural District, West Azerbaijan Province, Iran
Rahal, Iran, an Iranian village
Paola, Malta (Maltese: Raħal Ġdid), a town in Malta

Other uses
Rahal clan, a clan found among the Jats of Punjab, India
Rahal Letterman Lanigan Racing, American open-wheel racing team